Limal is a village of Wallonia and a district of the municipality of Wavre, located in the province of Walloon Brabant, Belgium.

Notes 

Wavre
Former municipalities of Walloon Brabant